Thomas Ashcraft (born 1951, Springfield, Illinois) is an American astronomer, naturalist, scientific instrument-maker, and artist. He is known for his observations of transient luminous events (lightning sprites), meteoric fireballs, solar radio and optical phenomena, and Jupiter radio emissions.

He is an artist and citizen scientist whose work, Heliotown II, is on exhibit in the old pool house located on the Hyde Park campus of at the Santa Fe Institute. He resides and maintains a laboratory and studio outside of Santa Fe, New Mexico where he operates the Observatory of Heliotown. Research-grade images, audio, and video captured at the observatory have been featured on NASA's Astronomy Picture of the Day blog.

Science practice 

In 1992, Ashcraft built the Radio Fireball Observatory for monitoring and recording fireballs, space dust, and meteoric phenomena. He has made numerous innovations in the merging of optical and radio telescope technology. In 2001, he began observing Jupiter, the sun, and ionospheric phenomena with NASA's Radio Jove Project.

In 2009, Ashcraft began noting lightning-generated phenomena called transient luminous events (red sprites) on his radio-optical telescope systems. Over time he has established a multi-faceted observatory devoted to the capture and study of this rarely imaged phenomenon.

Art practice 

Ashcraft is primarily a sculptor and installation artist incorporating space, time, mind, sound, and electricity. He is also a figurative sculptor exploring biological subjects such bacteriophages, viruses, microbes, and medicinal plants. He was awarded a Louis Comfort Tiffany Prize in art in 2005.

Selected publications 

Papers

 Gaopeng Lu, Steven A. Cummer, Jingbo Li, Lucian Zigoneanu, Walter A. Lyons, Mark A. Stanley, William Rison, Paul R. Krehbiel, Harald E. Edens, Ronald J. Thomas, William H. Beasley, Stephanie A. Weiss, Richard J. Blakeslee, Eric C. Bruning, Donald R. MacGorman, Tiffany C. Meyer, Kevin Palivec, Thomas Ashcraft, and Tim Samaras (2013) Coordinated observations of sprites and in-cloud lightning flash structure, American Geophysical Union, JGR Atmospheres
 Walter A. Lyons, T.A. Wanrenr, T.J. Lang, W. Rison, S.A. Cummer, M.G. McHarg, T. Ashcraft, K. Paliivec, J. Yue, T.E. Nelson, H.E. Edens, and M.A. Stanley (2015) Video and Photographic Investigations of Lightning and Transient Luminous Events, American Meteorological Society
 Timothy J. Lang, Walter A. Lyons, Steven A. Cummer, Brody R. Fuchs, Brenda Dolan, Steven A. Rutledge, Paul Krehbiel, William Rison, Mark Stanley, Thomas Ashcraft (2016) Observations of two sprite-producing storms in Colorado, American Geophysical Union, JGR Atmospheres
 David Typinski, Charles Higgins, Richard Flagg, Wes Greenman, Jim Sky, Roger Giuntini, Francisco Reyes, Shing F. Fung, James Brown, Thomas Ashcraft, Larry Dodd, James Thieman, and Leonard Garcia (2020) A Fresh Look at Jovian Decametric Radio Emission Occurrence Probabilities in the CML-Io Phase Plane, American Geophysical Union/NASA conference poster
 Shing F. Fung, Todd S. Anderson, Thomas Ashcraft, Wes Greenman, David Typinski, and James Brown (2020) Thunderstorms as Possible HF Radiation Sources of Propagation TeePee Signatures, American Geophysical Union/NASA conference poster

References

External links 
Heliotown, Thomas Ashcraft's observatory website
Otherworldly Photos Capture Mysterious Phenomena in Upper Atmosphere, WIRED Science
Audio: DIY Recordings of Awakening Sun, WIRED Science
Observing Lightning from the International SpaceStation, March 23, 2021, NASA ScienceCasts
Listen to a Solar Flare Drown Out Radio Communications Here on Earth, WIRED Science
Biggest Solar X-Ray Flare on Record - X20 - Sound, Solar and Heliospheric Observatory (SOHO)

Living people
1951 births
20th-century American male artists
21st-century American male artists
Scientists from New Mexico
21st-century American astronomers
20th-century American astronomers
Sculptors from New Mexico
People from Santa Fe, New Mexico
21st-century American sculptors
20th-century American sculptors
American male sculptors
American installation artists